Mange Tout is the second studio album by English synth-pop duo Blancmange, released in May 1984 by London Records. It was Blancmange's most successful studio album, peaking at number eight on the UK Albums Chart and was certified Gold by the British Phonographic Industry (BPI) on 25 January 1985 for sales in excess of 100,000 copies. The album contained four UK top-40 singles, two of which reached the top 10. The fourth single to be released and final track on the album is a cover version of ABBA's song "The Day Before You Came".

In addition to the usual vinyl and cassette release, a limited-edition vinyl picture disc was also released. The album was later released on CD, and a remastered deluxe edition was released by Edsel Records in 2008, which featured a second disc of remixes and B-sides.

Track listing

Personnel
Blancmange
 Neil Arthur – voice, drums, clarinet
 Stephen Luscombe – electric keyboards, piano, trumpet
 Blancmange – arrangement 

Additional musicians

 Pandit Dinesh – tabla ; Madal ; percussion 
 Deepak Khazanchi – sitar ; santoor 
 Bobby Collins – bass guitar 
 David Rhodes – guitars 
 The Uptown Horns – horns 
 Neil Jason – bass guitar 
 Bashiri Johnson – percussion ; bells 
 Dolette McDonald – background voices 
 Brenda Jay Nelson – background voices 
 Jocelyn Brown – background voices 
 Gavyn Wright – violins 
 Roy Gillard – violins 
 Garf Jackson – viola 
 Nigel Warren Green – cello 
 Andy Findon – flute 
 Linton Naiff – arrangement 
 Joe Mosello – trumpet 
 Vinnie Della-Rocca – saxophones 
 Jim Clouse – saxophones 
 Keith O'Quinn – trombone 
 Jack Gale – trombone 
 James Biondolillo – maestro 
 Jerry Marotta – percussion 
 Tawatha Agee – background voices 
 Brenda White – background voices 
 Vernice – background voices 
 Malcolm Ross – guitars 
 David McClymont – bass guitar 
 Michelle Cobbs – background voices 
 Janice Pendarvis – background voices 
 Dave Allen – bass guitar 
 Blair Cunningham – hi-hat ; percussion 
 Valery Ponomarev – trumpet solo 

Technical

 Peter Collins – production 
 Blancmange – production 
 John Owen Williams – production ; remix 
 John Luongo – production 
 Dennis Weinreich – remix 
 Jay Mark – engineering 
 Femi Jiya – engineering in London 
 Matthew Wallace – engineering assistance in London 
 Richard Digby Smith – engineering 
 Stephen Street – engineering assistance 
 Julian Mendelsohn – engineering 
 James Doherty – engineering in New York 
 Michael Hutchinson – engineering in New York 
 John Potoker – engineering in New York 
 Linda Randazzo – engineering assistance in New York 
 Jimmy Santis – engineering assistance in New York 
 Elisa Gura – engineering assistance in New York 
 Melanie West – engineering assistance in New York 
 Glenn Rosenstein – engineering assistance in New York 

Artwork
 Martyn Atkins – design
 Marcx – design

Charts

Weekly charts

Year-end charts

Certifications

Notes

References

External links
 

1984 albums
Albums produced by Peter Collins (record producer)
Albums recorded at Sigma Sound Studios
Blancmange (band) albums
London Records albums